ICAT Design and Media College  is a college specializing in digital design and media. It offersFull-Time Bachelor’s Degree, Master’s Degree and Post Graduate Professional Programs. The college has three campuses around South India: Chennai, Bangalore and Hyderabad. ICAT Design and Media college was formerly known as Image College of Arts, Animation & Technology.The college has affiliations with Bangalore University, Jawaharlal Nehru Architecture and Fine Arts University and has a technical collaboration with Alagappa University.

History 
ICAT was established in 2004 at Chennai. The original name of ICAT was Image College of Arts, Animation & Technology. ICAT started offering the 1 Year Post Graduate Professional Programs in Animation, Visual Effects, Game Design and Game Programming. In 2006, ICAT obtained validation from Wales University, UK and started offering Bachelor’s Degree Programs in Animation, Visual Effects, Game Design and Game Programming. In 2008, the college established two more campuses at Bangalore and Hyderabad after obtaining the validation from Wales University. Then in 2012, ICAT obtained validation from Birmingham City University, UK to offer UG courses in Design & Media at all the three campuses. During this collaboration, the college additionally offered Full Time Bachelor’s Degree Programs in Fashion Design, Interior Design, Photography, UI Design & Development, Graphic Design etc. [3] Later in 2013, considering the growing demand for an Indian University Degree among parents, ICAT entered into an MOU with Bharathiar University to offer 12 Bachelor’s Degree Programs and 2 Master’s Degree programs that were recognized by the Government of India. ICAT continued to offer the Post Graduate Professional Programs in 8 streams which were certified by ICAT. 
In the year 2018, ICAT obtained affiliation with Bangalore University for its Bangalore Campus and with JNAFAU for its Hyderabad Campus. ICAT entered into a technical collaboration with Alagappa University at its Chennai campus.

Academic programs
ICAT offers Post Graduate Diploma programs in Design & Media. Also it offers undergraduate degree programs in association with Bharathiar University, Birmingham City University, Jawaharlal Nehru Architecture and Fine Arts University, Annamalai University, Bangalore University.

Undergraduate Courses 
Undergraduate programs are offered as dual degree option- Bachelor of arts [hons.] program affiliated with Birmingham City University and Bachelor of Science [B.Sc] affiliated with Bharathiar University based in Coimbatore. Students can opt for dual degree program or can also select single degree at a time, This gives the flexibility to earn a University Grants Commission approved program and also international degree.

References

External links
 

Universities and colleges in Chennai
Animation schools in India
2004 establishments in Tamil Nadu
Educational institutions established in 2004